John Patrick Byrne (born 6 January 1940) is a Scottish playwright and artist. He wrote The Slab Boys Trilogy, plays which explore working-class life in Scotland, and the TV dramas Tutti Frutti and Your Cheatin' Heart. Byrne is also a painter, printmaker and theatre designer.

Life 
John Patrick Byrne was born into a family of Irish Catholic descent in Paisley, Renfrewshire and he grew up in the Ferguslie Park housing scheme. He was educated at the town's St Mirin's Academy and attended Glasgow School of Art from 1958 to 1963. His mother, Alice McShane, was married to Patrick Byrne when he was born. Byrne was conceived from incestuous abuse between his mother and her father, Patrick McShane. He did not know the truth about his parentage until he was informed by his cousin in 2002. He was initially angered by the revelation, but eventually reconciled with the truth of his lineage. He created The John Byrne Awards.

Work

Writer

Art 
From 1964 until 1966 Byrne designed jackets for Penguin Books. Having had his work rejected by various galleries, Byrne had success following an exhibition of works at London's Portal Gallery in 1967. Painted under the pseudonym of "Patrick", Byrne claimed the dream-like paintings were created by his father, an alleged self-taught painter of faux-naïf images. Byrne's career as a professional painter started in 1968, when he left Stoddard's.

As well as designing the scenery for his own plays Byrne, in collaboration with director Robin Lefrevre, also designed the settings for Snoo Wilson's The Number of the Beast (Bush 1982) and Clifford Odets' The Country Girl (Apollo Theatre 1983).

Byrne's best-known art works are arguably the album covers he created for friend Gerry Rafferty and his former bands The Humblebums and Stealers Wheel, among them the covers for City to City and Night Owl. Rafferty's early solo song "Patrick" is about Byrne.

Reviews
 Ross, Raymond J. (1983), Directed Irony, which includes a review of The Slab Boys, in Hearn, Sheila G. (ed.), Cencrastus No. 11, New Year 1983, pp. 45 & 46,

References

External links

1940 births
Scottish people of Irish descent
Living people
Alumni of the Glasgow School of Art
Artists from Paisley, Renfrewshire
People from Renfrewshire
Scottish dramatists and playwrights
20th-century Scottish painters
Scottish male painters
21st-century Scottish painters
21st-century Scottish male artists
Scottish scenic designers
Scottish contemporary artists
People educated at St Mirin's Academy
20th-century Scottish male artists